, prov. designation: , is a large trans-Neptunian object in the scattered disc, approximately  in diameter. It was discovered on 18 April 2010, by the Pan-STARRS 1 survey at Haleakala Observatory, Hawaii, United States.

Orbit and classification 

 orbits the Sun at a distance of 40.4–64.4 AU once every 379 years and 3 months (138,537 days; semi-major axis of 52.4 AU). The body's observation arc begins with its official discovery observation at Haleakala in April 2010.

Numbering and naming 

This minor planet was numbered by the Minor Planet Center on 25 September 2018. , it has not been named.

Physical characteristics 

According to Michael Brown and the Johnston's archive,  measures 626 and 770 kilometers in diameter, based on an absolute magnitude of 4.2 and 3.8, with an assumed albedo of 0.10 and 0.09, respectively. The MPC/JPL databases give an absolute magnitude of 3.92. From these observations, a lower limit of 575 km was placed for its mean diameter.

, no physical characteristics have been determined from photometric observations. The body's rotation period, pole and shape remain unknown.

References

External links 
 Discovery Circumstances: Numbered Minor Planets (520001)-(525000) – Minor Planet Center
 
 

Scattered disc and detached objects
Discoveries by Pan-STARRS
Possible dwarf planets
Objects observed by stellar occultation
20100418